Mac OS Icelandic is an obsolete character encoding that was used in Apple Macintosh computers to represent Icelandic text. It is largely identical to Mac OS Roman, except for the Icelandic special characters Ý, Þ and Ð which have replaced typography characters.

IBM uses code page 1286 (CCSID 1286) for Mac OS Icelandic.

Layout 
Each character is shown with its equivalent Unicode code point. Only the second half of the table (code points 128–255) is shown, the first half (code points 0–127) being the same as ASCII.

 Before Mac OS 8.5, the character 0xDB mapped to the currency sign (¤), Unicode character U+00A4.
 The character 0xBB maps to ﬁ, Unicode character U+FB01, in the TrueType Mac Icelandic fonts.
 The character 0xBC maps to ﬂ, Unicode character U+FB02, in the TrueType Mac Icelandic fonts.
 The character 0xF0 is a solid Apple logo. Apple uses U+F8FF in the Corporate Private Use Area for this logo, but it is usually not supported on non-Apple platforms.

References 

Character sets
Icelandic